Events in the year 1945 in Spain.

Incumbents
Caudillo: Francisco Franco

Births
June 9 - Luis Ocaña. (d. 1994)

Deaths
November 5 - Luís Fernando de Orleans y Borbón. (b. 1888)
 Fernando Obradors (b. 1897)

See also
List of Spanish films of the 1940s

References

 
Years of the 20th century in Spain
1940s in Spain
Spain
Spain